Violanthrone, also known as dibenzanthrone, is an organic compound that serves as a vat dye and a precursor to other vat dyes. X-ray crystallography confirms that the molecule is planar with C2v symmetry.  Isomeric with violanthrone is isoviolanthrone, which has a centrosymmetric structure.

Synthesis
It is produced by coupling of two molecules of benzanthrone.

References

Fluorescent dyes
Ketones
Polycyclic aromatic compounds